Fouquet's Paris is a historic high-end brasserie restaurant in Paris, France. It is located at 99 Avenue des Champs-Élysées and is part of Hotel Barrière Le Fouquet's Paris. The menu, designed in collaboration with Chef Pierre Gagnaire, continues the tradition of classic French cuisine, including Fouquet's beef tartare, sole meunière, Simmental beef fillet with Champs-Elysées sauce.

The brasserie is famous for its red awnings on the Champs-Elysées, which spread over the two terrasses on the Champs-Elysées and George V avenues.

For decades, Fouquet's Paris has been a place where people from the Culture industry would meet. It has strong ties with the Cinema, and hosts every year the traditional Gala dinner after the César ceremony.

The restaurant is listed as a historical French monument since 1990 (Inventaire des Monuments Historiques). The historical decor includes mahogany woodpanelling by Jean Royere, Harcourt portraits of notable actors and actresses, and discreet brass plaques which indicate the favourite tables of famous people. Most frequent guests own their silver napkin rings with their name engraved on it.

Although the name of the restaurant's founder, [Louis] Fouquet, is pronounced in the standard French way, rhyming with "bouquet", the restaurant name is pronounced with a hard "t" and "s", rhyming with the English word "nets".

History 
Fouquet's brasserie was founded in 1899 by Louis Fouquet. He called it after his French last name, "Fouquet", and added the "'s" to give it a trendy style, although he was born and raised in France.

Since 1990, the main room is listed as a historical French monument (Inventaire des Monuments Historiques).

In 1998, Fouquet's was purchased by Groupe Barrière. Then, the family owned French group created Hotel Barrière Le Fouquet's Paris by acquiring 6 buildings around the brasserie. Groupe Barrière inaugurated other Fouquet's restaurants, in France (Cannes, Toulouse, Courchevel, La Baule, Enghien-les-Bains), Switzerland (Montreux), Morocco (Marrakesh), and the United Arab Emirates (in the Louvre Abu Dhabi).

In March 2019, the restaurant was severely damaged during yellow vest protests. The restaurant Fouquet's Paris reopened a few month later for Bastille day, on July 14, 2019, identical as it was before.

In popular culture
Once per year Fouquet's hosts the traditional gala dinner for the César Awards, French equivalent of the Oscar.

Former head chefs 
André Fevre

See also
 Hôtel Barrière Le Fouquet's
 List of French restaurants

References

External links 
Fouquet's official homepage

French companies established in 1899
French restaurants in France
Restaurants in Paris
Buildings and structures in the 8th arrondissement of Paris